Kakuriyo: Bed and Breakfast for Spirits is an anime television series based on the light novel series written by Midori Yūma and illustrated by Laruha. The series was announced in November 2017 and is directed by Yoshiko Okuda at Gonzo, with scripts handled by Tomoko Konparu, characters designs done by Yōko Satō and music composed by Takurō Iga. It aired from April 2 to September 24, 2018, on the Tokyo MX and BS Fuji stations. The series ran for two cours, with 26 episodes in 9 DVD/Blu-ray releases.

Both Crunchyroll and Funimation streamed the series.


Episode list

Home releases

Japanese
In Japan, Happinet released the series in 9 volumes from July 3, 2018 to March 2, 2019.

English

Notes

References

Kakuriyo no Yadomeshi